Farahabad (also Romanized as Faraḩābād) is a village in Bafran Rural District, in the Central District of Nain County, Isfahan Province, Iran. At the 2006 census, its population was six, in five families.

References 

Populated places in Nain County